Lorenzo Sipi (born 13 May 1991) is an Australian footballer.

Career
Born in Townsville, Queensland, on 4 November 2010 it was announced he had signed a contract with A-League club North Queensland Fury Sipi made his debut for the Fury in round 13 against Melbourne Heart.

Rugby career
He also spent two years (2007 and 2008) playing rugby league for Tully Tigers.

Personal life
Sipi is of Torres Strait Island descent.

References

1991 births
Living people
Northern Fury FC players
A-League Men players
Indigenous Australian soccer players
Association football defenders
Australian soccer players
National Premier Leagues players
Brisbane Strikers FC players